Namukku Parkkan Munthirithoppukal is a 1986 Indian Malayalam-language romance drama film written and directed by Padmarajan based on the 1986 novel Nammukku Gramangalil Chennu Rapparkkam by K. K. Sudhakaran. The film stars Mohanlal, Shari, Thilakan, Vineeth, and Kaviyoor Ponnamma. The music was composed by Johnson. The plot is centered around a Malayali Syrian Christian-Nasrani ("Nazarene") family. Throughout the story, there are references to the Biblical book Song of Songs where it depicts the romantic dialogue between a young woman and her lover.

For the film, Venu won the National Film Award for Best Cinematography and Shari won the Kerala State Film Award for Best Actress and Filmfare Award for Best Actress in Malayalam.The film achieved cult status in Kerala and was considered to be one of the best romantic Malayalam films ever made.

Plot

Solomon's mother and college-going cousin Antony and a female relative who helps at the house lives in Mysore. Paul Pailokkaran, a railway employee, his wife, a nurse and two young daughters, Sofia and college-going Elizabeth, are the new inhabitants at the neighbouring house. Solomon lives in a farm and vineyard he owns in the outskirts of Mysore and comes to visit his mother once in a while. On one such visit, he meets Sofia and they are shown to begin to share a sweet bond. Romance blossoms. Sofia was born to her mother in her premarital love affair and her father is only her step-father. He often shows intention to molest her. She communicates all this to Solomon and their bond strengthens. They dream of a life together in his vineyard, laughing, smiling, loving, waking up to the chirping of birds and going around in his tanker lorry.

But when Solomon informs his mother of his love, she first disagrees to the marriage as Paul Pailokkaran is an uncouth person and he further reveals Sofia's birth secret to Solomon's mother in an attempt to prevent her marriage with Solomon. But Solomon finally manages to convince his mother and the marriage plans are set in motion. An irked Paul Pailokkaran, on a day when Sofia was alone at home for some time, attacks her, renders her unconscious and rapes her. Solomon, his mother and Sofia's mother come home to discover a distraught Sofia and learn of the rape. Solomon's mother decides once and for all that her son should not enter into alliance with such a family or such a girl. Fighting with his mother, Solomon leaves in his bike. Sofia is consoled by her mother that nothing has happened to her and she accepts it tearfully but expresses her pain that a person who ought to be in her father's position did this to her. Paul Pailokkaran returns home and is unremorseful. He taunts Sofia and her mother that now no-one will come to marry her.

In the wee hours of the next morning, everyone is awaken by the resounding horn of a tanker lorry. After the second horn, Solomon comes at the door of Sophie's home, calling out for her. Paul Pailokkaran opens the door and slyly smiling, says "now you can take her". Solomon hits him black and blue, calling out for Sofia again. When she finally comes out, he goes up to her, tells her "Hadn't we agreed if you didn't come out even after the second horn, I'll come pick you up and go?!" and, lifting her onto his shoulders, takes her to their tanker lorry, and, as his mother and cousin and Sofia's mother and half-sister look on,(implying that his mother has accepted her son's unconditional love now) drives out into the dawn, both of them smiling and hugging each other.

Cast
 Mohanlal as Solomon
 Shari as Sofia
 Thilakan as Paul Pailokkaran, Sofia's step-father
 Vineeth as Antony Joseph, Solomon's cousin
 Kaviyoor Ponnamma as Reetha, Solomon's mother
 Omana as Rosy Pailokkaran, Sofia's mother
 Mini as Elizabeth Paul, Sofia's step-sister
 Vishnu Prakash as Vakkachan
 Poojappura Radhakrishnan as Rajappan Nair
 N L Narayan as Mathachan
 Pallickal P.N.V as Vicar

Production
The title of the film and novel is based upon a passage from Biblical book of The Song of Solomon or Song of Songs, Chapter 7:12: "Let us get up early to the vineyards." The protagonist quotes this passage at one point during the film. The film is based on the 1986 novel Nammukku Gramangalil Chennu Rapparkkam by K. K. Sudhakaran.

Soundtrack 
The film features original songs composed by Johnson with lyrics by O. N. V. Kurup.

Accolades

References

External links
 
 Article about the film in Deepika

1986 films
1980s Malayalam-language films
Indian romantic drama films
Films shot in Mysore
Films scored by Johnson
Films with screenplays by Padmarajan
Films directed by Padmarajan
Films based on Indian novels
1986 romantic drama films
Films whose cinematographer won the Best Cinematography National Film Award